The National Centre of Scientific Research "Demokritos" (NRCPS) is a research center in Greece, employing over 1,000 researchers, engineers, technicians and administrative personnel. It focuses on several fields of natural sciences and engineering and hosts laboratory facilities.

The buildings cover an area of approximately 35.000 m (8.6 acres).

The Centre started its operation in 1959 as an independent division of the public sector under the name Nuclear Research Center "Demokritos", named in honour of the Greek philosopher Democritus. In 1985 it was renamed and given self-governing jurisdiction under the auspices of the General Secretariat of Research and Technology. The original objective of the newly created center was the advancement of nuclear research and technology for peaceful purposes. Today, its activities cover several fields of science and engineering.

The NCSR is a self-administered governmental legal entity, under the supervision of the General Secretariat of Research and Technology of the Ministry of Education.

Research Institutes

The research activities of the centre are conducted in eight administratively independent institutes:

Institute of Biology 
Institute of Materials Science (IMS) 
Institute of Microelectronics 
Institute of Informatics and Telecommunications (IIT)
Institute of Nuclear Technology - Radiation Protection (INT-RP) 
Institute of Nuclear Physics 
Institute of Radioisotopes & Radiodiagnostic Products 
Institute of Physical Chemistry

The INT-RP at Demokritos operates Greece's only nuclear reactor, a 5 MW research reactor.

The Environmental Research Laboratory (EREL)
The EREL is part of the Institute of Nuclear Technology - Radiation Protection (INT-RP) and it is one of the largest scientific research teams in Greece dealing with environmental research. The staff consists of 13 Ph.D. and 5 M.Sc. scientists, 4 Ph.D. students, 1 technician and 1 administrative assistant.

The research and development activities of the EREL include:

Weather Forecasting 
Urban air quality 
Emissions inventories
Air quality measurement, analysis and predictions 
Air pollutant dispersion modelling over terrain of high complexity on local, urban and regional scales. 
Transport in porous media and characterization of porous materials
Soil remediation

The DETRACT atmospheric dispersion modeling system
The DETRACT atmospheric dispersion modelling system, developed by the EREL, is an integrated set of modules for modelling air pollution dispersion over highly complex terrain.

The Media Networks Laboratory
The Laboratory is a part of the “Digital Communications” research programme of the Institute of Informatics and Telecommunications, NCSR “Demokritos”. It is located in the premises of NCSR in Athens, Greece and employs high-qualified research personnel, specialised in networking and multimedia technologies. The laboratory has been active for more than a decade in a number of national and European research projects, following the reputation of the Institute of Informatics and Telecommunication in the global research communities. In this context, it maintains close collaboration with Greek and international partners, both industrial and academic. The research achievements of the laboratory are reflected in a considerable number of publications in journals and conferences.

The lab pioneered in 2001 by developing the first digital television platform to support fully interactive services in Greece (and one of the first ones in Europe).

Photos

See also
Atmospheric dispersion modelling
List of atmospheric dispersion models
Czech Hydrometeorological Institute
Finnish Meteorological Institute
List of nuclear reactors
List of research institutes in Greece
Met Office, the UK meteorological service
National Center for Atmospheric Research
NERI, the National Environmental Research Institute of Denmark
NILU, the Norwegian Institute for Air Research
UK Atmospheric Dispersion Modelling Liaison Committee
UK Dispersion Modelling Bureau

References

External links
NCSR Demokritos website (in Greek and English)
Website of the Institute of Informatics and Telecommunications (IIT) 
Environmental Research Laboratory official website
Website of the Media Networks Laboratory
Website devoted to the DETRACT dispersion modeling system
Website devoted to the DIPCOT dispersion model

Scientific organizations established in 1959
1959 establishments in Greece
Research institutes in Greece
Nuclear technology in Greece
Nuclear research institutes
Multidisciplinary research institutes
Atmospheric dispersion modeling
Organizations based in Athens
Agia Paraskevi